Linvill is a surname. Notable people with the surname include:

John G. Linvill (1919–2011), American professor emeritus of Electrical engineering
William Linvill (1919–1980), American electrical engineer

See also
Linville (disambiguation)